The 4th constituency of Drôme is a French legislative constituency in the Drôme département.  It contains the cantons Bourg-de-Péage, Le Grand-Serre, Romans-sur-Isère-1, Romans-sur-Isère-2, Saint-Donat-sur-l'Herbasse and Saint-Vallier.

Deputies

Election Results

2022

 
 
 
 
 
 
|-
| colspan="8" bgcolor="#E9E9E9"|
|-

2017

2012

References

4